Within the field of information technology, information criteria are a core component of the COBIT (Control Objectives for Information and Related Technologies) framework that describes the intent of the objectives. The specifics are the control of:

Effectiveness deals with information being relevant and pertinent to the business process as well as being delivered in a timely, correct, consistent and usable manner.

Efficiency concerns the provision of information through the optimal (most productive and economical) use of resources.

Confidentiality concerns the protection of sensitive information from unauthorised disclosure.

Integrity relates to the accuracy and completeness of information as well as to its validity in accordance with business values and expectations.

Availability relates to information being available when required by the business process now and in the future. It also concerns the safeguarding of necessary resources and associated capabilities.

Compliance deals with complying with the laws, regulations and contractual arrangements to which the business process is subject, i.e., externally imposed business criteria as well as internal policies.

Reliability relates to the provision of appropriate information for management to operate the entity and exercise its fiduciary and
governance responsibilities.

References 

 CobiT 4.1

Standards